Ornipholidotos muhata is a butterfly in the family Lycaenidae. It was described from the Democratic Republic of the Congo. The species is treated as a nomen dubium by Libert in 2005.

References

Butterflies described in 1887
Ornipholidotos
Endemic fauna of the Democratic Republic of the Congo
Butterflies of Africa
Taxa named by Hermann Dewitz